270 Park Avenue, also known as the JPMorgan Chase Building, is a skyscraper under construction in the Midtown Manhattan neighborhood of New York City. Designed by the firm of Foster + Partners, the tower is expected to rise up to  when it is completed in 2025.

The tower replaces the 55-story Union Carbide Building, built in 1960 and demolished in 2021, which housed the global headquarters for JPMorgan Chase. The financial firm is using 383 Madison Avenue until it can move into the new building.

Site 
270 Park Avenue is in the Midtown Manhattan neighborhood of New York City. It occupied an entire city block bounded by Madison Avenue to the west, 48th Street to the north, Park Avenue to the east, and 47th Street to the south. Nearby buildings include the old New York Mercantile Library and 400 Madison Avenue to the west; Tower 49 to the northwest; 277 Park Avenue to the east; 245 Park Avenue to the southeast; and 383 Madison Avenue to the south.

The completion of the underground Grand Central Terminal in 1913 resulted in the rapid development of Terminal City, the area around Grand Central, as well as a corresponding increase in real-estate prices. Among these were office buildings such as the Chanin Building, Bowery Savings Bank Building, and New York Central Building, as well as hotels like the Biltmore, Commodore, Waldorf Astoria, and Summit. The site of 270 Park Avenue had been occupied by a six-building complex, the Hotel Marguery, which opened in 1917 and was developed by Charles V. Paterno. The stone-clad hotel was 12 stories high and designed in the Renaissance Revival style. By 1920, the area had become what The New York Times called "a great civic centre".

Architecture
Sources disagree on the number of stories. The New York Times indicates that the building will rise 70 stories, Emporis cites a figure of 63 stories, and the Council on Tall Buildings and Urban Habitat gives a figure of 60 stories. Above the lobby will be a series of setbacks to the west and east, tapering to a pinnacle.

The interior will fit 15,000 employees and will contain a food hall, a penthouse conference center, a fitness center, and large spaces illuminated by natural lights. The floor plates will be able to be configured in several layouts. To comply with city legislation, which bans the use of natural gas in all new buildings constructed after 2027, the structure will be powered entirely by hydroelectric energy. Ninety-seven percent of materials from the old building had been salvaged during its demolition; much of this material would be used in the new building.

The design team also includes Adamson Associates as architect of record; Jaros, Baum & Bolles as MEP engineer; and Severud Associates as structural engineer.

History

Planning 
In February 2018, JPMorgan announced it would demolish the former Union Carbide Building to make way for a structure that was almost twice as tall. This was the first major project to be announced as part of the Midtown East rezoning in the 2010s. The former building became the tallest voluntarily demolished building in the world, overtaking the previous record-holder Singer Building that was demolished in 1968.  The replacement , 70-story headquarters would have space for 15,000 employees. Tishman Construction Corporation will be the construction manager for the project.

To build the larger structure, JPMorgan purchased hundreds of thousands of square feet of air rights from nearby St. Bartholomew's Episcopal Church as well as from Michael Dell's MSD Capital, the owner of the air rights above Grand Central Terminal. In October 2018, JPMorgan announced that British architectural firm Foster + Partners would design the new building. However, this also raised concerns that the taller building would require deeper foundations that could interfere with the Metropolitan Transportation Authority's East Side Access tunnels and the Grand Central Terminal's rail yards, which are directly underneath 270 Park Avenue.

In May 2019, the New York City Council unanimously approved JPMorgan's new headquarters. In order to secure approvals, JPMorgan was required to contribute $40 million to a district-wide improvement fund and incorporate a new  privately owned public space plaza in front of the tower. After pressure from Manhattan Borough President Gale Brewer and City Council member Keith Powers, JPMorgan also agreed to fund numerous upgrades to the public realm surrounding the building including improvements to Grand Central's train shed as well as a new entrance to the station at 48th Street. The MTA had planned to repair the Grand Central Terminal train shed's concrete and steel as part of the 2020–2024 MTA Capital Program. The first portion of the train shed to be repaired was underneath 270 Park Avenue, since the agency wished to conduct the repair work alongside new developments where possible.

Construction 

In July 2019, the MTA and JPMorgan Chase signed an agreement, in which JPMorgan agreed to ensure that the destruction of 270 Park Avenue would not disrupt the timeline of East Side Access. The same month, scaffolding was wrapped around the tower and podium structure on the Madison Avenue side of the building, marking the beginning of building demolition. At the time, demolition was scheduled to be completed at the end of 2020.  By late December 2020, the demolition of the main tower had not yet been completed, but parts of the new superstructure were being assembled on the Madison Avenue side, as demolition on the podium structure had been completed earlier. The first steel beams of the new structure were being assembled by the following month, in January 2021, three months before demolition of the main tower concluded.

The old building was demolished by mid-2021, after which the columns in the base began construction across the entire lot. By the end of the year, cranes and construction elevators had been built. In April 2022, JPMorgan CEO Jamie Dimon announced that he would further consolidate the company's New York City offices at 270 Park Avenue, since half of the staff would be able to work from home at least part of the time. , the building is estimated to be completed in 2025.

Reception
Architectural critic Alexandra Lange described the new 270 Park Avenue in 2022 as "a Son of Hearst Tower grafted on top of creepy legs."

See also
 List of tallest buildings in New York City
 List of tallest buildings in the United States

References

External links 
 

Financial services company headquarters in the United States
Foster and Partners buildings
JPMorgan Chase buildings
Midtown Manhattan
Park Avenue
Skyscraper office buildings in Manhattan